Vice Admiral Marcel Harcourt Attwood Kelsey CB, DSC (21 February 1894 – 27 August 1964) was a Royal Navy officer who became Flag Officer, Malta.

Naval career
Kelsey joined the Royal Navy in September 1911 and served in the First World War. Promoted to captain on 31 December 1936, Kelsey became deputy director of Personal Services at the Admiralty in September 1937. He served in the Second World War becoming commanding officer of the cruiser HMS Naiad in April 1940, Commodore-in-Charge, Freetown in April 1942 and commanding officer of the battleship HMS Warspite in March 1944. As captain of HMS Warspite he led the bombardment squadron during Operation Infatuate, an Anglo-Canadian operation to open the port of Antwerp to shipping and relieve logistical constraints. He went on to be Commodore, Royal Naval Barracks, Chatham in January 1945.

After the War he became Flag Officer, Malta in June 1946.

References

1894 births
1964 deaths
Royal Navy vice admirals
Companions of the Order of the Bath
Recipients of the Distinguished Service Cross (United Kingdom)